Lykes Brothers Inc, is a  corporation founded by the Lykes Family of Tampa, Florida, in 1910. This family would become the largest landowners in Florida, the ninth largest landowners in the United States and the wealthiest in Tampa Bay.

In the 1870s Dr. Howell Tyson Lykes abandoned a medical career in Columbia, South Carolina and took over a  family cattle ranch in rural Hernando County north of Tampa. The Lykes Family started the first school in this county in Spring Hill, Florida and the library at the county seat, Brooksville, Florida also bears the Lykes name. Spring Hill refers to the community that grew up around the Lykes Family home called Spring Hill, which is distinct and separate from the later development by the Deltona Corporation by the same name. The family cemetery is located outside of Brooksville.

In 1895, Dr. Lykes moved to Ballast Point in Tampa, Florida where he began shipping cattle to Cuba. Gradually, his seven sons joined the family operations which incorporated in 1910 as Lykes Brothers. This corporation would come to comprise interests in land, citrus, phosphate mining, timber (eucalyptus, pine), sugarcane, a major shipping line (Lykes Brothers Steamship Company), cattle and meat processing, banking (First Florida Bank) and Lykes Insurance Company.

In the 1930s, Lykes Bros. purchased the  Lykes Ranch in West Texas, south of Alpine.
By the 1950s, Lykes Bros. Steamships was the largest U.S. shipping line, with 54 cargo ships operating out of Gulf ports. A Lykes Bros. ship would be the first to sail into Shanghai harbor after the U.S. established relations with mainland China. A leader in citrus concentrate, the $15 million Lykes Pasco citrus-processing plant was the biggest in Florida. It is now a cooperative farm.

See also
 Lykes Palmdale Airport
 Lykes Building
Muse, Florida

References
Notes

Further reading

External links
 
 Lykes Ranch (FL) website

Conglomerate companies established in 1910
Companies based in Florida
Companies based in Tampa, Florida
Real estate companies established in 1910
1910 establishments in Florida